Trooper O'Neill is a 1922 American silent Western film directed by Scott R. Dunlap and starring Buck Jones, Beatrice Burnham, and Francis McDonald.

Cast
 Buck Jones as Trooper O'Neill
 Beatrice Burnham as Marie 
 Francis McDonald as Pierre 
 Claude Payton as Black Flood 
 Sid Jordan as Rodd 
 Jack Rollens as Paul 
 Karl Formes as Jules Lestrange

References

Bibliography
 Solomon, Aubrey. The Fox Film Corporation, 1915-1935: A History and Filmography. McFarland, 2011.

External links

 
 

1922 films
1922 Western (genre) films
Films directed by Scott R. Dunlap
Fox Film films
Silent American Western (genre) films
1920s English-language films
1920s American films